Radim Žitko (born 8 December 1978) is a Czech former professional tennis player.

Žitko, who comes from Plzeň, had a career best singles ranking of 253 in the world and won six titles at ITF Futures level. He made ATP Tour main draw appearances at the 2001 Japan Open and the 2005 Dutch Open. In 2006 he featured in the qualifying draw for the US Open.

Locally, Žitko played club tennis for TK Slavia Plzeň and also competed in the German Bundesliga for TB Erlangen.

ITF Futures titles

Singles: (6)

Doubles: (5)

References

External links
 
 

1978 births
Living people
Czech male tennis players
Sportspeople from Plzeň